The Royle Family is a British sitcom produced by Granada Television for the BBC, which ran for three series from 1998 to 2000, and specials from 2006 to 2012. It centres on the lives of a television-fixated Manchester family, the Royles, comprising family patriarch Jim Royle (Ricky Tomlinson), his wife Barbara (Sue Johnston), their daughter Denise (Caroline Aherne), their son Antony (Ralf Little) and Denise's fiancé (later husband) David (Craig Cash).

The series features simple production values and a comic portrayal of working-class family life at the turn of the millennium. It therefore has something in common with kitchen sink drama. Almost all of the episodes take place in the Royles' home, largely in the telly-centric living room, with the humour derived from the conversations held therein. Aherne and Cash co-wrote every episode, along with Henry Normal (series one), Carmel Morgan (series two), and Phil Mealey (five Christmas specials). The later specials are presented in a more traditional sitcom format. A further special episode was set to be written, but Aherne was ill and died on 2 July 2016, effectively ending the programme.

In the British Film Institute's list of the 100 greatest British television programmes drawn up in 2000 and voted on by industry professionals, The Royle Family was placed 31st. In a 2001 Channel 4 poll, Jim Royle, the misanthropic head of the household known for such mocking phrases as "my arse!", was ranked eleventh on their list of the 100 Greatest TV Characters. In a 2004 BBC poll to find Britain's Best Sitcom, The Royle Family was placed 19th. The series also won several BAFTA awards.

Series
Most episodes appear to take place in real time and all action takes place within the Royles' council house home. (The passage of time as indicated by the changing programmes on the Royles' TV sometimes suggests that the action has been compressed.)

Unlike most UK sitcoms of the time, the show was filmed in 16 mm film using single camera production style and was not filmed in front of an audience. The producer Glenn Wilhide is on record as saying, "It was a big fight to make sure it had no laugh track".

The one-off specials take a more traditional sitcom storyline, though many scenes still run longer than standard in line with the 'real time' nature of the original series. The 2006 special episode "The Queen of Sheba" was partly set in a hospital. Its narrative moves forward in time in a more structured manner. 2008's Christmas special, "The New Sofa", is set over two days. In it the characters spend Christmas Eve at the Royle household in the traditional manner (in front of the television), followed by Christmas Day at Dave and Denise's. Much of the 2009 Christmas special takes place in a caravan at a holiday park. It also features intermediate scenes of Dave driving the car there. All of the 2010 and 2012 Christmas specials takes place at the Royles' house. There was widespread speculation as to whether the show would return after the 2012 special. In 2016, Tomlinson said that there would probably be a Christmas special that year; however, Aherne's death in July 2016 effectively ended any chances of a return for the show.

The show's theme song is "Half the World Away" by Oasis. When Aherne died, ex-Oasis member Noel Gallagher performed a tribute to Aherne by playing it during a concert in Nashville, Tennessee.

Characters

Main
Ricky Tomlinson as James Randolph "Jim" Royle 
Misanthropic, cynical and selfish, Jim is a slob who spends his days sitting in his armchair watching television doing as little as possible and enjoys announcing his visits to the lavatory. Jim is an impatient miser and regularly mocks his family, in particular Antony and his mother-in-law Norma, when not judging celebrities on television. Jim's outbursts are often accompanied by his critical catchphrase, "my arse!" On occasions he shows a more understanding side, especially when his family is in need of support. Jim has shown himself to be a big music fan. Often knowledgeable about songs, he will sing song lyrics that fit in to conversation. He is also able to play the banjo and does so on special occasions and at the request of his family.
Sue Johnston as Barbara Royle (née Speakman) 
Barbara is the long-suffering wife of Jim, who lives for her family; her caring nature is often exploited by the selfishness of husband Jim and daughter Denise, who let her do almost everything for them. Despite this, she is often shown to be more friendly, polite, compassionate and level-headed than her husband. Barbara works part-time at a bakery, and for a time is the only member of the family to have a job. The stress of her life causes her to have a breakdown during Series 2. Johnston and Tomlinson previously played a married couple, Sheila and Bobby Grant, in Liverpool-based soap Brookside.
Caroline Aherne as Denise Best (née Royle) 
The only daughter of Jim and Barbara, Denise is extremely lethargic, pretentious and apathetic. Before meeting Dave, Denise was engaged to a man named Stewart, but called off the engagement. She and Barbara are both smokers. She marries Dave in the first series, and they have two children, Baby David and Norma, though she rarely looks after her children, instead passing her duties on to everyone else. Jim also used to mock her for only serving her husband rudimentary dinners such as Dairylea cheese spread on toast and spaghetti hoops. Denise is known for her heavy reliance on cigarettes. She and Barbara love smoking, and often fill the ashtray. Denise is sometimes verbally abusive to her younger brother Antony, regularly leaving him to babysit her children and along with her father, forcing him to make cups of tea for the family. However, there are scenes of Denise being friendly and loyal to those close to her. Sometimes she will stick up for her brother Antony, Nana or Cheryl if either of them is subject to ridicule from other characters, and in an intimate scene in The Queen of Sheba, she promises to her Nana that she will make her funeral fun; which she does.
Ralf Little as Antony James Royle (1998–2010)
Antony is the son of Jim and Barbara, and generally treated as a dogsbody by the family, ordered to do menial tasks such as answering the door, making cups of tea and babysitting Dave and Denise's children. He is the only member of the family (other than Barbara) who actually does any work in the house or otherwise. He is often mocked by Jim, Denise and Dave and is surprised when in one episode, Denise sticks up for him followed by Jim showing him a great deal of support. Although originally unemployed with little prospects, it was revealed in the 2006 special that Antony had gone on to become a successful businessman and no longer lives in Manchester. He gets engaged to girlfriend Emma after she falls pregnant and they have a son named Lewis, but prior to the 2006 special, they have separated and Antony has recently starting dating a girl named Sarah. In 2009, he is in a relationship with Saskia, who falls pregnant in early-2010, and goes into labour on Christmas Day after he has proposed.
Craig Cash as David "Dave" Best 
Denise's boyfriend and later husband, Dave is initially depicted as a 'jack the lad' cheeky chappy and later portrayed as slow, lethargic and indolent, perhaps due to working full-time and being sole carer to his and Denise's baby. He is shown to be generous and good-natured, often putting up with Denise's selfish lifestyle. He is often Jim's sidekick and he takes Jim's side when the latter is arguing with Barbara or Denise. Denise often takes advantage of Dave, leaving him to change nappies and care for their children when they get upset. Denise and Dave announced that she was pregnant, and she later gave birth to baby David, and later in the series, Denise announced she was pregnant again and she later had a baby girl, whom she called Norma after Barbara's mother. Dave previously dated Denise's enemy, Beverley Macker, and this is often brought up by Antony to annoy Denise. In the later series specials, Dave is portrayed as an extremely dim-witted loafer.

Recurring
Liz Smith as Norma Jean Speakman (Nana) (1998–2006)
Barbara's demanding elderly mother, called "Nana" by Denise and Antony. Jim and Norma had a highly bitter feud, as Jim often calls her names such as a "greedy old cow" when she didn't share her Revels with him. Norma often looks for sympathy from her family, repeating the fact that she is the only living elderly woman in her block of flats, and she often hints that she wants to move in with the Royles. When her best friend Elsie dies, Jim and Norma argue because Norma goes from mourning to talking about Elsie's television and clothes. Norma eventually moved in with the Royles when her health rapidly declined and she died during the 2006 special – Liz Smith was 85 at the time of making the programme. When Nana died, Jim felt extremely remorseful because of how he feuded with her and decided in a mark of respect, to put her ashes on top of the television set, a place where she would always be remembered.
Jessica Hynes as Cheryl Carroll (1998–2010)
The daughter of Joe and Mary, and the best friend of Denise. Cheryl lives next-door to the Royles and constantly battles with her weight, going from one unsuccessful diet to the next. Jim, Dave and Antony often ridicule her weight behind her back. She enjoys looking after Denise's children, a situation Denise takes advantage of. Cheryl is portrayed as unlucky in love, though she has a relationship with Twiggy between the 2006 and 2008 episodes, before leaving him for a man with a burger van. On Christmas Day 2010, Cheryl revealed she had been dating a homeless person called "Spamhead" who stole her father's savings before leaving her. Until 2006, she is credited as Jessica Stevenson.
Doreen Keogh as Mary Carroll (1998–2006)
Mary lives next door to the Royles with her husband Joe and daughter Cheryl. She is Irish and is portrayed as a talkative busybody (in direct contrast to her husband). She last appears in the 2006 special and by Christmas 2009 her health has deteriorated and she suffers from severe incontinence. By the 2010 Christmas special, Mary had died.
Peter Martin as Joe Carroll
Joe is the husband of Mary and father of Cheryl. Joe is very shy, a regular source of mocking by Jim and Antony, though after a few drinks he generally becomes more sociable, and has on a couple of occasions proven to be a talented singer. He also appears to be a lot more confident and happy in Mary's absence. After Mary's death, he carries her ashes around with him and talks of her constantly, and decides to move house before Cheryl convinces him to remain.
Geoffrey Hughes as Twiggy (1998–2008)
Twiggy is a longtime family friend of the Royles, and regularly visits, usually with rip-off materials or stolen goods to sell on. He has been in prison, and fathered at least two sons, and later briefly dated Cheryl, though the relationship didn't last. Twiggy sees prison as a holiday and describes it as "recharging the old batteries". Twiggy's criminal tendencies become more serious as the series progresses, at first he sells knock-offs then in 'The New Sofa', he appears at Denise's house with several half-empty spirit bottles (with optics still attached), presumably stolen from the local pub, he nonchalantly claims he could have got more if the dog hadn't started barking. Twiggy's last appearance was in the 2008 Christmas special as Hughes retired in 2010 and died in 2012.
Andrew Whyment as Darren Sinclair-Jones (1999–2000)
Darren is friends with Antony in Series 2 and 3. Darren is portrayed to be dull, uneducated and of an apathetic demeanour. Like Twiggy, Darren is light-fingered and has been sacked from every job he's had for stealing. His brothers are all in prison, his father is an alcoholic who never leaves the pub and his mother (when not in hospital with her failing health) lives with Darren in a house where the bailiffs have taken all the furniture. On Christmas Day 2000, Antony and Emma ask Darren to be godfather to their unborn child.
Sheridan Smith as Emma Kavanagh (1999–2000)
Emma is Antony's first girlfriend. She first appears in the Series 2 finale, after being mentioned several times in earlier episodes. Emma comes from a wealthy family, but gets on well with the Royles. In the Series 3 finale, Antony announces his engagement to Emma, which leads Jim and Barbara to assume that Emma is pregnant. In the 2000 Christmas special, Emma's arrogant parents, Roger and Valerie, meet Jim and Barbara for the first time. Emma does not appear in the 2006 special, by which time she has separated from Antony. Antony and Emma continue to share custody of their son, Lewis, who appears in the 2006 special.
Joanne Froggatt as Saskia (2010)
Saskia is the girlfriend of Antony She is mentioned in the 2009 Christmas special and appears on Christmas Day 2010. She is an A&E nurse and is heavily pregnant when she appears. The Royles have a high level of interest in Saskia and have no respect for her privacy; for example, they read her diary and look through her clothes. In 2009, she did not wish to go to the Royles' household due to Jim's behaviour on a previous visit. Antony proposed to Saskia on Christmas Day 2010, and later she goes into labour a month early.

Episodes

1998–2000: Original run
The first series aired on BBC Two in 1998, quickly gaining a following such that it was moved to BBC One for the second series in 1999, when it became even more popular. A Christmas special aired in 1999, followed by a third series and another Christmas special in 2000. Whilst each of the episodes can be viewed independently of each other, the first three series each have their own story arc running through them to give a greater sense of continuity, again unique for a British sitcom of this era. In series one the focus is on the buildup to Dave and Denise's wedding day, in the second series it partly focuses on Denise's pregnancy culminating in her giving birth on Christmas Day in the Christmas special. The third series builds up to Baby David's Christening as well as the relationship between Antony and Emma. Certain episodes also appear to parallel each other if the first three series are watched in order- for example the fifth episode of the first season focuses on a row between Dave and Denise whilst the fifth episode of the second season focuses on a row between Jim and Barbara.

In 2000 Aherne announced that she would not write or star in any more episodes. Ricky Tomlinson also pulled out to ensure the show's end.

2006–2012: Specials
On 7 April 2006, the BBC announced that Aherne and Cash were to write a script for a one-off special, which was broadcast on 29 October 2006. The episode received widespread critical acclaim, having been watched by over 8,000,000 viewers.

"The Queen of Sheba" takes place six years after the events of the last series and features Nana's declining health and death. It won the Best Sitcom award at the 2007 BAFTAs, and won the Royal Television Society Award for Best Situation Comedy & Comedy Drama. Liz Smith's performance won her the Best TV Comedy Actress award at the National Television Awards and was BAFTA-nominated.

The 2008 Christmas special, entitled "The New Sofa" was the first that took place mainly outside of the Royles' house. It began at the Royles', but moved to the Bests' house early on. Ralf Little did not appear in this episode, but his character is referenced. The hour-long special aired on Christmas Day 2008, and attracted 10,600,000 viewers, making it the fifth most watched programme on Christmas Day and the fifth most watched for the entire week ending 28 December 2008.

The Royle Family returned as part of Comic Relief, on 13 March 2009. It also marked the return of Ralf Little as Antony, who joined Dave, Denise, Jim and Barbara in the one-off mini episode.

Another Christmas special, "The Golden Egg Cup", was broadcast on 25 December 2009, at 9:00 pm on BBC One and also in HD on the BBC HD channel. The episode was the most watched show on TV on Christmas Day and for the entire week ending 26 December 2009, attracting an audience of 11,740,000 viewers and the highest-rated episode of The Royle Family.

In November 2010 Gold broadcast a two-hour episode called "Behind The Sofa", with interviews from the cast and crew celebrating the show's return in 2006. Another show entitled Royle Family Portraits was aired on Gold on Wednesday 17 November. 

Another Christmas special entitled "Joe's Crackers" was aired on 25 December 2010, on BBC One and BBC HD. The ratings for the BBC One transmission were 11,290,000 viewers, making it the fourth-most watched programme of Christmas Day and the sixth most watched for the entire week ending 26 December 2010.

Another Christmas special was planned for 2011. but a script was not completed in time for filming.

A final Christmas special for 2012, entitled "Barbara's Old Ring", aired on 25 December 2012. The broadcast was the third most popular programme on Christmas Day, achieving a rating of 9,900,000 viewers and was the sixth most watched programme for the week ending 30 December, across all UK TV channels.

A short charity special was made for Comic Relief in 2013.

A further special episode was set to be written, but Aherne was ill with lung cancer and died on 2 July 2016, effectively ending the programme. Tomlinson stated that he would not do further episodes without Aherne.

Reception

Ratings

Source: BARB

Awards and nominations

Home media

VHS releases
 The Royle Family: The Complete 1st Series – 8 November 1999.
 The Royle Family: The Complete 2nd Series – 6 November 2000.
 The Essential Royle Family (Marks & Spencer exclusive) – includes Series 1, episode 2, Series 2, episodes 4, 5 & 7 (released 2000).
 The Royle Family: The Complete 3rd Series – 19 November 2001.
 The Royle Family: The Complete 1st Series / The Complete 2nd Series / The Complete Third Series box set – 19 November 2001.
 The Very Best of the Royle Family – 25 November 2002. (see DVD section for episodes).

DVD releases

Streaming
In the United Kingdom, the complete series was made available via several streaming services including BBC iPlayer and subscription services, BritBox and Now. In Australia, the series is currently available to stream via Foxtel Now.

Books
 The Royle Family: The Scripts – Series 1, by Caroline Aherne, Craig Cash, and Henry Normal. London: Granada Media/Andre Deutsch, 15 November 1999.
 The Royle Family: The Scripts – Series 2, by Caroline Aherne, Craig Cash, and Carmel Morgan. London: Granada Media, 18 September 2000.
 The Royle Family: My Arse, by Caroline Aherne. Welbeck Publishing Group, 1 October 2001.
 The Royle Family: The Complete Scripts, covers all scripts from Series 1, 2, and 3. Granada Media, 5 August 2002.

Audiobooks
 The Royle Family (BBC Radio Collection), features four episodes from the first series. BBC Audiobooks Ltd., 6 November 2000.
 The Royle Family 2 (BBC Radio Collection), features four episodes from the second series. BBC Audiobooks Ltd., 5 November 2001.
 The Royle Family 3 (BBC Radio Collection), features four episodes from the third series. BBC Audiobooks Ltd., 25 November 2002.
 The Royle Family Collection (BBC Radio Collection), features twelve episodes from the first, second and third series. BBC Audiobooks Ltd., 25 November 2002.

Connections to other works
The subsequent sitcom Early Doors was also written by Craig Cash and Phil Mealey and has a similar production style and setting to The Royle Family. Cash also appears in Early Doors.

A frequent pastime for the family is watching the BBC series Antiques Roadshow and betting on the outcome of valuations.

In several episodes, the family are seen watching Coronation Street, a long-running Northern English-based soap opera, in which Sue Johnston, Doreen Keogh, Geoffrey Hughes and Andrew Whyment have all played regular characters. Guest actors Sally Lindsay (Michelle, Twiggy's girlfriend), Sharon Duce (Valerie, Emma's Mother), Steve Huison (Derek, Cheryl's Boyfriend) Helen Fraser (Jocelyn Best, Dave's Mother) and Joanne Froggatt (Saskia, Antony's fiancée) have also appeared in the programme.

In the 1999 Christmas special, Nana (Liz Smith) asks when Dibley is on, meaning The Vicar Of Dibley (1994-2007), 'with that big funny girl who dresses up as a vicar', meaning Dawn French. Smith herself had starred in The Vicar Of Dibley in which she had played Letitia Cropley until her character was killed off in 1996.

Sue Johnston and Joanne Froggatt would work together once again on the UK period drama, Downton Abbey, both as lady's maids, Johnston playing Gladys Denker, the lady's maid of Maggie Smith's character, and Froggatt playing Anna Smith Bates, the lady's maid of Michelle Dockery's character.

Caroline Aherne and Craig Cash have both narrated and Cash continues to narrate the Channel 4 series Gogglebox, which, like The Royle Family, features people watching TV.

Ralf Little and Sheridan Smith were also cast as a couple in the BBC Three sitcom Two Pints of Lager and a Packet of Crisps.

American version
In 2001, it was announced that a proposed remake was in the works and to be retitled The Kennedys. The American version, produced for CBS, featured Randy Quaid as Jim Kennedy, Pamela Reed as Pamela (Barbara), Sarah Ann Morris as Denise, John Francis Daley as Anthony, and Page Kennedy as Roger (Dave). It was set in Boston and followed the lives of a blue-collar, working-class family. The series was to adapt the original plot lines of the first series of The Royle Family. A pilot was produced in April 2001, which did not prove successful and therefore CBS opted not to pick the show up.

References

External links

1998 British television series debuts
2012 British television series endings
1990s British sitcoms
2000s British sitcoms
2010s British sitcoms
BAFTA winners (television series)
BBC television sitcoms
English-language television shows
Television shows produced by Granada Television
Television series about marriage
Television series about dysfunctional families
Television series by ITV Studios
Television shows set in Manchester